Dominic Peter Mancini (born August 1, 1956) is a Canadian politician and lawyer. Mancini was elected to the House of Commons of Canada in the 1997 federal election that saw a breakthrough for the New Democratic Party in the province of Nova Scotia.  He served as the NDP's justice critic in the 36th Canadian Parliament. Mancini represented the riding of Sydney—Victoria until the 2000 federal election when he was defeated by Liberal Mark Eyking. He moved to Dartmouth, Nova Scotia following his electoral defeat. He was unsuccessful in his attempt at a comeback in the 2006 federal election in the riding of Dartmouth—Cole Harbour losing to incumbent Michael Savage by just over 4,000 votes.

Early life and education
Born in Westmount, Nova Scotia, Mancini was educated at Dalhousie University, where he was a member of the Dalhousie Senate and Vice President of the Student Council. He graduated from Dalhousie Law School in 1982.

Legal career
He has worked for Nova Scotia Legal Aid in criminal and family law since 1986 save for one year when he taught at the University College of Cape Breton and his years in parliament.

On December 12, 2014, Mancini was appointed a Queen's Counsel.

Political career
Mancini received over 50% of the popular vote in 1997. It was during his time as MP that the Liberal Government announced the shutdown of the coal mines run by the Cape Breton Development Corporation.  Mancini and other political leaders fought for increased pension packages for the workers and an economic diversification fund.  He was the MP when the federal government began a remediation program for the Sydney Tar Ponds.  When Robert Chisholm resigned as leader of the Nova Scotia NDP in 1999, Mancini was seen as a possible front runner for the post but declined to run.

Personal life
He is married to Marian Mancini, who was elected to the Nova Scotia House of Assembly on July 14, 2015.

Electoral record

References 

1956 births
Living people
Members of the House of Commons of Canada from Nova Scotia
New Democratic Party MPs
Schulich School of Law alumni
People from the Cape Breton Regional Municipality
Canadian King's Counsel